Vincent Gale (born 6 March 1968) is a Scottish-born Canadian film and television actor, who won the Genie Award for Best Supporting Actor at the 2002 Genie Awards for his performance in the film Last Wedding.

Career 
Gale's other acting credits include the films Firewall, Bye Bye Blues, Fathers & Sons, Inuyasha: Affections Touching Across Time and Hello Mary Lou: Prom Night II, and the television series Snowpiercer, The Dragon Prince, Neon Rider, Queer as Folk, Da Vinci's Inquest, X-Men: Evolution, Dragon Boys, Eureka, Blackstone, Stargate SG-1, Stargate Universe, Battlestar Galactica, Bates Motel, Supernatural, Arrow and Supergirl. He played "Flesh" on the Syfy network series Van Helsing.

Filmography

Film

Television

External links

References 

1968 births
Living people
Canadian male film actors
Canadian male television actors
Canadian male voice actors
Best Supporting Actor Genie and Canadian Screen Award winners
Scottish emigrants to Canada